United Telecommunications was the predecessor company of two United States telecommunications companies:
Sprint Corporation, a mobile telecommunications company based in Overland Park, Kansas
Embarq, the former local telephone division of Sprint, now part of CenturyLink